Aleksander Margiste (19 April 1908 – 10 August 1988) was an Estonian basketball player. He competed in the 1936 Summer Olympics.

References

External links
 
 
 

1908 births
1988 deaths
Basketball players from Tallinn
People from the Governorate of Estonia
Estonian men's basketball players
Olympic basketball players of Estonia
Basketball players at the 1936 Summer Olympics